Johannes Gijsbert Vogel (25 June 1828 – 15 May 1915) was a Dutch landscape painter.

Vogel was born in Hooge Zwaluwe, (Drimmelen), as the son of the local mayor and moved to the Hague, where he became a pupil of Andreas Schelfhout. He became a member of Pulchri Studio and married Maria Henrietta Catherina van Wielik on 26 April 1854. After she died on 4 January 1892 he remarried the painter Margaretha Roosenboom, who was the granddaughter of his former teacher Schelfhout. After she died in 1896 he remarried a third time on 25 March 1902 to Margo Adelaide Eldine Fannij Gaijmans.

Vogel was the brother of architect Hugo Pieter Vogel.

Vogel died in Velp.

References

1828 births
1915 deaths
People from Drimmelen
19th-century Dutch painters
Dutch male painters
20th-century Dutch painters
19th-century Dutch male artists
20th-century Dutch male artists